A drop catcher may be:

A small piece of absorbent paper put on the bottom of a beer glass to prevent its contents from dripping onto the table (not to be confused with a beermat).
A Domain name registrar who sells dropped names.